Petite Suite, Sz. 105, BB 113 is a reduction for piano of six of Bartók's 44 Duos for Two Violins, arranged by the composer in 1936.

Structure 

This six-movement work is a collection of excerpts from the 44 duos above mentioned. The movement list is as follows:

Notable recordings 

Notable recordings of the piano reduction include:

References

External links 

 

Suites by Béla Bartók
Compositions for solo piano
1936 compositions